The Metropolitan Library System (MLS) was an association of academic, public, school, and special libraries in Chicago and its suburbs in Cook, DuPage and Will counties.  On July 1, 2011, Metropolitan Library System merged with Alliance Library System, DuPage Library System, North Suburban Library System, and Prairie Area Library System to form the Reaching Across Illinois Library System. Sarah Ann Long, director of the North Suburban Library System,  summarized the evolution of organizations in northern Illinois in a 2011 essay,"Context is Everything."

SWAN 
SWAN (System Wide Automated Network) maintains a shared online catalog for its 80 members.

Member Libraries 
Grande Prairie Public Library
Orland Park Public Library
Richton Park Public Library District
River Forest Public Library

References

External links 
Metropolitan Library System
SWAN catalog

Public libraries in Illinois
1966 establishments in Illinois
Burr Ridge, Illinois